National Liberation Army is the name of:

 National Liberation Army (Algeria) (Armée de Libération Nationale), a liberation movement in the Algerian War of Independence
 National Movement for the Liberation of Azawad, refers to its fighters as the National Liberation Army
 National Liberation Army (Bolivia) (Ñancahuazú Guerrilla), a Marxist–Leninist movement during the 1960s and 1970s
 National Liberation Army (Colombia) (ELN - ), an active movement associated with the Colombian Civil War
 National Liberation Army of Iran, an inactive liberation movement based in Iran
 Irish National Liberation Army, an Irish Republican group active during The Troubles
 Kosovo Liberation Army, also known as the National Liberation Army of Kosovo
 National Liberation Army (Libya), the armed forces of Libyan rebels during the Libyan civil war
 National Liberation Army (Macedonia), a militant group in the 2001 insurgency in the Republic of Macedonia
 Macedonian National Liberation Army, a partisan detachment during the People's Liberation War of Macedonia in World War II
 National Liberation Army (Peru)
 Liberation Tigers of Tamil Eelam, Sri Lanka
 West Papua National Liberation Army, a separatist army in Western New Guinea, Indonesia
 National Liberation Army (Yugoslavia), Yugoslav World War II resistance movement, the Partisans
 Zimbabwe African National Liberation Army, military wing of the Zimbabwe African National Union during the Rhodesian Bush War

See also 
 National Liberation Front (disambiguation)